Wajib ( Wājib, "Duty") is a 2017 Palestinian drama film directed by Annemarie Jacir. It was screened in the Contemporary World Cinema section at the 2017 Toronto International Film Festival. It was selected as the Palestinian entry for the Best Foreign Language Film at the 90th Academy Awards, but it was not nominated.

Wajib (2017) won 36 international awards including Best Film in Mar Del Plata, Dubai, Amiens, DC Film Festival, Kerala and the London BFI Festival.

Plot
In this road movie, a father and son travel amid wedding preparations in the lead-up to Christmas in Nazareth.

Cast
 Mohammad Bakri as Abu Shadi
 Saleh Bakri as Shadi
 Maria Zreik as Amal

Reception

Critical reception
On review aggregator Rotten Tomatoes, the film holds an approval rating of 100%, based on 35 reviews with an average rating of 7.6/10.

Awards
Muhr Awards for Best Fiction Feature Film and for Best Actor (for Mohammad Bakri and Saleh Bakri), Dubai International Film Festival 2017
Golden Crow Pheasant for Best Film, International Film Festival of Kerala 2017
Arab Critics Awards for Best Film, Best Screenplay and Best Actor (for Mohammad Bakri), Cannes Film Festival 2018
Golden Astor for Best Film and Silver Astor for Best Actor (for Mohammad Bakri) Mar del Plata International Film Festival 2017

See also
 List of submissions to the 90th Academy Awards for Best Foreign Language Film
 List of Palestinian submissions for the Academy Award for Best Foreign Language Film

References

External links
 

2017 films
2017 drama films
Palestinian drama films
2010s Arabic-language films
Best Film Muhr Awards winners